Ellertshaar is a hamlet in the Dutch province of Drenthe. It is a part of the municipality of Borger-Odoorn, and lies about 17 km southeast of Assen.

The hamlet was first mentioned in 1851 as Eldershaar, and means "alder trees on a sandy ridge". Ellershaar was home to 8 people in 1840.

References

Populated places in Drenthe
Borger-Odoorn